The Burroughs B5000 was the first stack machine and also the first computer with a segmented virtual memory.
The Burroughs B5000 instruction set includes the set of valid operations for the B5000, B5500 and B5700. It is not compatible with the B6500, B7500, B8500 or their successors.

Instruction streams on a B5000 contain 12-bit syllables, four to a word. The architecture has two modes, Word Mode and Character Mode, and each has a separate repertoire of syllables. A processor may be either Control State or Normal State, and certain syllables are only permissible in Control State. The architecture does not provide for addressing registers or storage directly; all references are through the 1024 word Program Reference Table (PRT), current code segment, marked locations within the stack or to the A and B registers holding the top two locations on the stack. Burroughs numbers bits in a syllable from 0 (high bit) to 11 (low bit) and in a word from 0 (high bit) to 47 (low bit).

Word Mode

In Word Mode, there are four types of syllables.

The interpretation of the 10-bit relative address in Operand Call and Descriptor Call depends on the setting of several processor flags. For main programs (SALF off) it is always an offset into the Program Reference Table (PRT).

Character Mode

References

Computer hardware
Stack machines
Virtual memory